Pye can refer to:

British businesses
 Pye (electronics company), an electronics manufacturer
 Pye Records, a record label
 Pye International Records, its subsidiary

Literature
Ginger Pye, a 1951 novel by Eleanor Estes
 Mr Pye, a 1953 novel by Mervyn Peake
 Pye, a fictional owl in the Guardians of Ga'Hoole series

People
 Pye (surname)
 Pye Dubois, musician
 Pye Hastings, musician
 Pye Min (1619-1672), king of Toungoo dynasty, Burma

Places
Pye (Osnabrück district), a German suburb
 Pye Bridge railway station, Derbyshire, English Midlands
 Pye Corner railway station, Newport, south Wales
 Pye Corner in the City of London, location of the Golden Boy of Pye Corner
 Pye Road, an ancient Roman road in southern England

Other uses
 Pye baronets, two titles of English nobility
 Pye dog, or Indian pariah dog